Kojak is an American crime drama television series starring Ving Rhames. It is a remake of Kojak starring Telly Savalas. The series lasted for one season, airing on USA Network from March 25 to May 22, 2005.

Premise
Rhames portrays Lieutenant Theo Kojak of the New York City Police Department, a skilled plain clothes detective with a shaved head and an affinity for jazz, fine clothing, and lollipops.  As in the original Kojak, he is fond of the catchphrase "Who loves ya, baby?"

Cast
Ving Rhames as Lieutenant Theo Kojak
Chazz Palminteri as Captain Frank McNeil
Michael Kelly as Detective Bobby Crocker
Chuck Shamata as Detective Henry Messina
Roselyn Sánchez as ADA Carmen Simone
Sybil Temtchine as Detective Emily Patterson

Episodes

Broadcast
It aired on the USA Network in the United States. In the United Kingdom, the series aired on ITV4.

References

External links
 
 

2000s American drama television series
2005 American television series debuts
2005 American television series endings
Television series by Universal Television
USA Network original programming
Television shows set in New York City
Fictional portrayals of the New York City Police Department
Kojak
English-language television shows
Television series reboots
American detective television series